The 2001–02 Red Stripe Bowl was the 28th season of what is now the Regional Super50, the domestic limited-overs cricket competition for the countries of the West Indies Cricket Board (WICB). It ran from 2 to 14 October 2001, with matches played in Guyana and Jamaica.

Eight teams contested the competition, four of which were competing for the first time. The two finalists from the previous season, the Leeward and Windward Islands, were each broken up into two teams. From the Leewards, Antigua and Barbuda entered separately, with players from the remaining countries competing for a "Rest of Leeward Islands" team. The Windwards team was split geographically, with players from Dominica and Saint Lucia competing for a "Northern Windward Islands" team and players from Grenada and Saint Vincent and the Grenadines competing for a "Southern Windward Islands" team. None of the new teams managed to make the finals, which were contested by the four traditional teams (Barbados, Guyana, Jamaica, and Trinidad and Tobago). Guyana eventually defeated Barbados in the final to win a seventh domestic one-day title. Jamaican batsman Chris Gayle and Barbadian bowler Hendy Bryan led the tournament in runs and wickets, respectively.

Squads

Group stage

Zone A

Zone B

Finals

Semi-finals

Final

Statistics

Most runs
The top five run scorers (total runs) are included in this table.

Source: CricketArchive

Most wickets

The top five wicket takers are listed in this table, listed by wickets taken and then by bowling average.

Source: CricketArchive

See also
 2001–02 Busta Cup

References

2001 in West Indian cricket
2001–02 West Indian cricket season
Regional Super50 seasons
Domestic cricket competitions in 2001–02